The Nandi Award for Sarojini Award Film on National Integration was commissioned in 1983:

Winners

See also
 Cinema of Andhra Pradesh

References 

National Integration